Inor (pronounced ), sometimes called Ennemor, is an Afroasiatic language spoken in central Ethiopia. One of the Gurage languages, it is mainly spoken within the Gurage Zone in the Southern Nations, Nationalities, and Peoples' Region, as well as by speakers of the language who have settled in Ethiopian cities, especially Addis Ababa. In addition to the morphological complexity that is common to all Semitic languages, Inor exhibits the very complex morphophonology characteristic of West Gurage languages.

Endegegn, Enner, Gyeto, and the extinct dialect Mesmes are all sometimes considered dialects of Inor.

Inor possesses nasal vowels, which are unusual for a Gurage language. Many of these may be the result of historical rhinoglottophilia.

Phonology

Consonants

Vowels 

 may be regarded as largely epenthetic and only marginally phonemic.

References

Bibliography 
Abza, Tsehay (2016). "Consonants and Vowels in the Western Gurage Variety Inor: Complex Connections between Phonemes, Allophones, and Free Alternations", in Binyam Sisay Mendisu & Janne Bondi Johannessen (eds.) Multilingual Ethiopia: Linguistic Challenges and Capacity Building Efforts, Oslo Studies in Language 8(1), pp. 31–54.
Berhanu Chamora. "Consonant distribution in Inor", in: G. Hudson (ed.), Essays on Gurage Language and Culture (Wiesbaden: Harrassowitz Verlag), pp. 53–67.

Bustorf, Dirk. (2005). "Ennämor Ethnography”, in: Siegbert Uhlig (ed.): Encyclopaedia Aethiopica, vol. 2: D-Ha, Wiesbaden: Harrassowitz Verlag, p. 307-08.
Boivin, Robert (1996). "Spontaneous Nasalization in Inor", in: G. Hudson (ed.), Essays on Gurage Language and Culture (Wiesbaden: Harrassowitz Verlag), pp. 21–33.
Hetzron, R. (1977). The Gunnän-Gurage Languages. Napoli: Istituto Orientale di Napoli.
Leslau, W. (1979). Etymological Dictionary of Gurage (Ethiopic). 3 vols. Wiesbaden: Otto Harrassowitz. 
Leslau, W. (1983). Ethiopians Speak: Studies in Cultural Background. Part V : Chaha - Ennemor. Äthiopistische Forschungen, Band 16. Wiesbaden: Franz Steiner Verlag. 
Leslau, W. (1996). "Inor Lullabies", in: Africa 66/2, pp. 280–287.
Voigt, Rainer.(2005). "Ennämor Language”, in: Siegbert Uhlig (ed.): Encyclopaedia Aethiopica, vol. 2: D-Ha, Wiesbaden: Harrassowitz Verlag, p. 307.

Outer Ethiopian Semitic languages
Languages of Ethiopia